Union Bank UK plc (UBUK), a UK incorporated bank, is a wholly owned subsidiary of the Union Bank of Nigeria.
The bank has been operating from the   City of London since 1983, firstly as the London branch of the parent bank, and since October 2004 as an independently incorporated UK bank, having received authorization from the Financial Services Authority, known now as the UK Financial Conduct Authority.

UBUK provides a comprehensive range of banking services to customers doing business with Nigeria and other West African countries, including trade finance, personal banking, business banking, treasury services, commercial lending and private banking. 

Its parent, the Union Bank of India  has a   history dating back to 1917, when it first opened its doors for business as the Colonial Bank. In 1925 it was bought by Barclays, becoming Barclays Bank Dominion, Colonial and Overseas which it remained until the early 1970s.

In 1971, Barclays incorporated the bank locally in Nigeria as Barclays Bank of Nigeria plc and sold a significant shareholding to the Federal Government and the Nigerian public. In 1979 the bank's name was changed to the Union Bank of Nigeria plc, to reflect the change in its ownership structure.

In the early 1990s the Nigerian Government started a policy of privatisation of state owned assets, which resulted in 1993 in both the Government and Barclays selling their remaining stakes in the bank to the public at large, thus creating a truly publicly owned bank.

References

External links

Union Bank of Nigeria plc
fsa.gov.uk
bba.org.uk
wck2.companieshouse.gov.uk

Banks based in the City of London
Banks established in 2004
Financial services companies based in the City of London